José Charlet, (October 19, 1916 in Bourg-en-Bresse – 1993) was a French architect, painter, sculptor, and professor at the Beaux Arts of Paris.
Architect of the 49, rue du Pas Saint Maurice House in Suresnes France in 1959

Life
From 1946, he exhibited his work in Los Angeles, where the MOMA of New York bought a sculpture from him.

References

External links
http://www.artnet.com/artists/jose-charlet/past-auction-results
https://web.archive.org/web/20080914080038/http://www.panoramio.com/photo/1517982
http://www.bruun-rasmussen.dk/search.do?pg=6&t=a&iid=300425130&did=1003076&lang=en&mode=detail

20th-century French painters
French male painters
1916 births
1993 deaths
People from Bourg-en-Bresse
20th-century French sculptors
20th-century French male artists
French male sculptors
20th-century French architects